Mary Kim Titla (born November 24, 1960) is an American publisher, Native American youth advocate, journalist, former TV reporter for KVOA in Tucson, where in 1987 she became the first Native American television journalist in Arizona, and later KPNX in Phoenix, and was a 2008 candidate for Arizona's First Congressional District. Titla is a self described moderate Democrat. As an educator her personal vision is “Everyone involved in a child’s education must go above and beyond to ensure every student receives a world class education in a safe environment.” She is an enrolled member of the San Carlos Apache Tribe.

The Democratic primary for the 1st District seat was held on September 2, 2008. Titla lost to former Arizona state representative and prosecutor Ann Kirkpatrick, who received 47%.  Titla placed second, garnering 33% of the vote.  Others in the primary included: Ahwatukee attorney Howard Shanker, who received 14% and former Dennis Kucinich coordinator Jeffrey Brown, who received 6%.

Titla obtained her undergraduate degree from the University of Oklahoma and her master's degree from the Walter Cronkite School of Journalism and Mass Communication at Arizona State University. In November 2006, Titla was inducted into the Cronkite School's Alumni Hall of Fame. Titla now serves as executive director of United National Indian Tribal Youth (UNITY) located in Mesa, Arizona.

See also
 United States House of Representatives elections in Arizona, 2008

References

External links
 UNITY, Inc.

1960 births
Living people
20th-century American journalists
21st-century American journalists
21st-century American politicians
20th-century Native Americans
21st-century Native Americans
Apache people
American women television journalists
Native American journalists
Native American women in politics
University of Oklahoma alumni
Walter Cronkite School of Journalism and Mass Communication alumni
21st-century American women politicians
20th-century American women
20th-century Native American women
21st-century Native American women